Linn County is a county located in the U.S. state of Iowa. As of the 2020 census, the population was 230,299, making it the second-most populous county in Iowa. The county seat is Cedar Rapids. Linn County is named in honor of Senator Lewis F. Linn of Missouri. Linn County is included in the Cedar Rapids, IA Metropolitan Statistical Area.

History

The earliest inhabitants of Linn County, prior to Anglo settlement, were the Sac and Fox tribes. Relations were  described by 20th century historians as amicable. Native Americans provided food and furs to whites in exchange for merchandise.

Linn County was created as a named but unorganized area on December 21, 1837, as a part of Wisconsin Territory. It became part of Iowa Territory on July 4, 1838, when the territory was organized. Linn County was organized by the first legislative assembly of the Iowa Territory on January 15, 1839. A site was selected for its first county seat along Indian Creek, and was named Marion, after the Revolutionary War general Francis Marion. As early as 1855, there were debates over moving the county seat to the fast-growing Cedar Rapids, southwest of Marion, but it was not until November 6, 1919, that there were enough votes in favor of the move (9,960 to 4,823). The first rail line was built through Cedar Rapids in 1859, and made the town (and the county) a major commercial hub in eastern Iowa.

Many areas of the county were damaged by the flooding of Cedar River in June 2008, and again during the August 2020 Midwest derecho.

Geography

Major highways
 Interstate 380
 Iowa Highway 27
 U.S. Highway 30
 U.S. Highway 151
 U.S. Highway 218
 Iowa Highway 1
 Iowa Highway 13

Transit
 Cedar Rapids Transit
 List of intercity bus stops in Iowa

Adjacent counties
Benton County  (west)
Buchanan County  (northwest)
Cedar County  (southeast)
Delaware County  (northeast)
Iowa County  (southwest)
Johnson County  (south)
Jones County  (east)

Demographics

2020 census
There were 101,230 housing units, of which 94,751 were occupied.

2010 census
There were 92,251 housing units, of which 86,134 were occupied.

2000 census

At the 2000 census there were 191,701 people, 76,753 households, and 50,349 families in the county. There were 80,551 housing units at an average density of 112 per square mile (43/km2). The racial makup of the county was 93.90% White, 2.57% Black or African American, 0.22% Native American, 1.37% Asian, 0.05% Pacific Islander, 0.46% from other races, and 1.44% from two or more races.  1.42%. were Hispanic or Latino of any race.

Of the 76,753 households 31.80% had children under the age of 18 living with them, 53.20% were married couples living together, 9.00% had a female householder with no husband present, and 34.40% were non-families. 27.50% of households were one person and 8.90% were one person aged 65 or older.  The average household size was 2.43 and the average family size was 2.99.

Age spread:  25.30% under the age of 18, 10.10% from 18 to 24, 30.30% from 25 to 44, 22.10% from 45 to 64, and 12.20% 65 or older.  The median age was 35 years. For every 100 females, there were 96.10 males.  For every 100 females age 18 and over, there were 93.40 males.

The median household income was $46,206 and the median family income  was $56,494. Males had a median income of $38,525 versus $26,403 for females. The per capita income for the county was $22,977.  About 4.30% of families and 6.50% of the population were below the poverty line, including 7.60% of those under age 18 and 6.40% of those age 65 or over.

Government
On July 24, 2007, the voters of Linn County approved a measure to change the form of government from a three-member Board of Supervisors elected at large to a five-member Board of Supervisors elected by district. The supervisors serve overlapping four-year terms.

The current supervisors are:

The Board of Supervisors operate as both the executive and legislative branches of Linn County government.  The following departments report directly to the Board of Supervisors: Communications, Community Services, Engineering/Secondary Road, Facilities, Finance and Budget, Human Resources, Information Technology, LIFTS (para-transit), Planning and Development, Policy and Administration, Purchasing, Risk Management, Soil and Water Conservation, Sustainability, and Veteran Affairs. Conservation and Public Health report to independent boards appointed by the Board of Supervisors. The County Attorney, Auditor, Recorder, Sheriff and Treasurer are elected separately.

Communities

Cities

Alburnett
Bertram
Cedar Rapids
Center Point
Central City
Coggon
Ely
Fairfax
Hiawatha
Lisbon
Marion
Mount Vernon
Palo
Prairieburg
Robins
Springville
Walford
Walker

Unincorporated communities

Covington
Lafayette
Paris
Toddville
Troy Mills
Waubeek
Western
Whittier
Viola

Ghost towns

Ivanhoe

Townships

Bertram
Boulder
Brown
Buffalo
Clinton
College
Fairfax
Fayette
Franklin
Grant
Jackson
Linn
Maine
Marion
Monroe
Otter Creek
Putnam
Spring Grove
Washington

Population ranking

The population ranking of the following table is based on the 2020 census of Linn County.

† county seat

See also

National Register of Historic Places listings in Linn County, Iowa
 USS Linn County (LST-900)

References

External links

Linn County government's website
The History of Linn county, Iowa  
History of Linn County Iowa by Luther A. Brewer and Barthinius L. Wick 

 
1839 establishments in Iowa Territory
Populated places established in 1839
Cedar Rapids, Iowa metropolitan area